Simkin is a given name and a surname. As a surname in Slavic countries it's used for males, while the feminine counterpart is Simkina. It may refer to
Given name
Simkin de Pio (born 1976), Filipino painter

Surname
 Daniil Simkin (born 1987), Russian ballet dancer
Darren Simkin (born 1970), English football player
Jim Simkin (1919–1984), Canadian-American psychotherapist
 John Simkin (1883–1967) Anglican Bishop in New Zealand
 Dr J. L. Simkin (1833–1905) British biochemist
 Richard Simkin (1850–1926), British artist and illustrator of military uniforms
 Toby Simkin (born 1964), theatrical producer 
 William E. Simkin (1907–1992), American labor mediator and private arbitrator

Other
 Simkin (character), in "Dark Sword"